Pirris River is a river of Costa Rica, flowing into the Pacific Ocean.

References

Rivers of Costa Rica